Stenanona is a genus of flowering plants in the family Annonaceae. There are about 14 species native to Mexico and Central and South America. The genus is found in rainforest habitat.

These plants are small trees. The leaves have a coating of hairs and are borne on swollen petioles. The petals are somewhat thin but moderately fleshy in texture and are various shades of pink or red; one species has purple flowers. The petals sometimes fade whitish. The flowers are bisexual.

Species include:
Stenanona carrillensis
Stenanona cauliflora
Stenanona columbiensis
Stenanona costaricensis
Stenanona flagelliflora
Stenanona hondurensis
Stenanona humilis
Stenanona migueliana
Stenanona monticola
Stenanona narinensis
Stenanona panamensis
Stenanona stenopetala
Stenanona tuberculata
Stenanona tubiflora
Stenanona wendtii

References

Annonaceae
Annonaceae genera
Taxonomy articles created by Polbot